The Foundations of Geopolitics: The Geopolitical Future of Russia is a geopolitical book by Aleksandr Dugin. Its publication in 1997 was well received in Russia; it has had significant influence within the Russian military, police, and foreign policy elites, and has been used as a textbook in the Academy of the General Staff of the Russian military. Powerful Russian political figures subsequently took an interest in Dugin, a Russian political analyst who espouses an ultranationalist and neo-fascist ideology based on his idea of neo-Eurasianism, who has developed a close relationship with Russia's Academy of the General Staff.

Dugin credits General Nikolai Klokotov of the Academy of the General Staff as co-author and his main inspiration, though Klokotov denies this. Colonel General Leonid Ivashov, head of the International Department of the Russian Ministry of Defence, helped draft the book.

Use
Klokotov stated that in the future the book would "serve as a mighty ideological foundation for preparing a new military command". Dugin has asserted that the book has been adopted as a textbook in many Russian educational institutions. Former speaker of the Russian State Duma, Gennadiy Seleznyov, for whom Dugin was adviser on geopolitics, "urged that Dugin's geopolitical doctrine be made a compulsory part of the school curriculum".

The book may have been influential in Vladimir Putin's foreign policy, which eventually led to the 2022 Russian invasion of Ukraine.

Content
In Foundations of Geopolitics, Dugin makes a distinction between "Atlantic" and "Eurasian" societies, which means, as Benjamin R. Teitelbaum describes it "between societies whose coastal geographical position made them cosmopolitan and landlocked societies oriented toward preservation and cohesion". Dugin calls for the "Atlantic societies", primarily represented by the United States, to lose their broader geopolitical influence in Eurasia, and for Russia to rebuild its influence through annexations and alliances. 

The book declares that "the battle for the world rule of Russians" has not ended and Russia remains "the staging area of a new anti-bourgeois, anti-American revolution". The Eurasian Empire will be constructed "on the fundamental principle of the common enemy: the rejection of Atlanticism, strategic control of the U.S., and the refusal to allow liberal values to dominate us." Interestingly, it seems he does not rule out the possibility of Russia joining and/or even supporting EU and NATO instrumentally in a pragmatic way of further Western subversion against geopolitical "Americanism".

Military operations play a relatively minor role besides the military intelligence operations he calls "special operations". The textbook advocates a sophisticated program of subversion, destabilization, and disinformation spearheaded by the Russian special services. The operations should be assisted by a tough, hard-headed utilization of Russia's gas, oil, and natural resources to bully and pressure other countries. The book states that "the maximum task [of the future] is the 'Finlandization' of all of Europe".

In Europe:
 Germany should be offered the de facto political dominance over most Protestant and Catholic states located within Central and Eastern Europe. Kaliningrad Oblast could be given back to Germany. The book uses the term "Moscow–Berlin axis".
 France should be encouraged to form a bloc with Germany, as they both have a "firm anti-Atlanticist tradition".
 The United Kingdom, merely described as an "extraterritorial floating base of the U.S.", should be cut off from Europe.
 Finland should be absorbed into Russia. Southern Finland will be combined with the Republic of Karelia and northern Finland will be "donated to Murmansk Oblast".
 Estonia should be given to Germany's sphere of influence.
 Latvia and Lithuania should be given a "special status" in the Eurasian–Russian sphere, although he later writes that they should be integrated into Russia rather than obtaining national independence.
 Belarus and Moldova are to become part of Russia, not independent.
 Poland should be granted a "special status" in the Eurasian sphere.
 Romania, North Macedonia, Serbia, "Serbian Bosnia" and Greece – "Orthodox Christian collectivist East" – will unite with "Moscow the Third Rome" and reject the "rational-individualistic West".
 Ukraine should be annexed by Russia because "Ukraine as a state has no geopolitical meaning, no particular cultural import or universal significance, no geographic uniqueness, no ethnic exclusiveness, its certain territorial ambitions represents an enormous danger for all of Eurasia and, without resolving the Ukrainian problem, it is in general senseless to speak about continental politics". Ukraine should not be allowed to remain independent, unless it is cordon sanitaire, which would be inadmissible according to Western political standards.

In the Middle East and Central Asia:
 The book stresses the "continental Russian–Islamic alliance" which lies "at the foundation of anti-Atlanticist strategy". The alliance is based on the "traditional character of Russian and Islamic civilization".
 Iran is a key ally. The book uses the term "Moscow–Tehran axis".
 Armenia has a special role: It will serve as a "strategic base," and it is necessary to create "the [subsidiary] axis Moscow-Yerevan-Teheran". Armenians "are an Aryan people ... [like] the Iranians and the Kurds".
 Azerbaijan could be "split up" or given to Iran.
 Georgia should be dismembered. Abkhazia and "United Ossetia" (which includes Georgia's South Ossetia and the Republic of North Ossetia) will be incorporated into Russia. Georgia's independent policies are unacceptable.
 Russia needs to create "geopolitical shocks" within Turkey. These can be achieved by employing Kurds, Armenians and other minorities (such as Greeks) to attack the ruling regimes.
 The book regards the Caucasus as a Russian territory, including "the eastern and northern shores of the Caspian (the territories of Kazakhstan and Turkmenistan)" and Central Asia (mentioning Kazakhstan, Uzbekistan, Kyrgyzstan and Tajikistan).

In East and Southeast Asia:
 Dugin envisions the fall of China. China, which represents an extreme geopolitical danger as an ideological enemy to the independent Russian Federation, "must, to the maximum degree possible, be dismantled". Dugin suggests that Russia start by taking Tibet–Xinjiang–Inner Mongolia–Manchuria as a security belt. Russia should offer China help "in a southern direction – Indochina (except Vietnam), the Philippines, Indonesia, Australia" as geopolitical compensation.
 Russia should manipulate Japanese politics by offering the Kuril Islands to Japan and provoking anti-Americanism, to "be a friend of Japan".
 Mongolia should be absorbed into Eurasia-Russia.

The book emphasizes that Russia must spread geopolitical anti-Americanism everywhere: "the main 'scapegoat' will be precisely the U.S."

In the United States and Canada:
 Russia should use its special services within the borders of the United States to fuel instability and separatism, for instance, provoke "Afro-American racists". Russia should "introduce geopolitical disorder into internal American activity, encouraging all kinds of separatism and ethnic, social and racial conflicts, actively supporting all dissident movements – extremist, racist, and sectarian groups, thus destabilizing internal political processes in the U.S. It would also make sense simultaneously to support isolationist tendencies in American politics".

The Eurasian Project could be expanded to South and Central America.

Reception and impact
Hoover Institution senior fellow John B. Dunlop stated that "the impact of this intended 'Eurasianist' textbook on key Russian elites testifies to the worrisome rise of neo-fascist ideas and sentiments during the late Yeltsin and the Putin period". Historian Timothy D. Snyder wrote in The New York Review of Books that Foundations of Geopolitics is influenced by the work of Carl Schmitt, a proponent of a conservative international order whose work influenced the Nazis. He also noted Dugin's key role in forwarding the ideologies of Eurasianism and National Bolshevism.

The book was described by Foreign Policy as "one of the most curious, impressive, and terrifying books to come out of Russia during the entire post-Soviet era", and "more sober than Dugin's previous books, better argued, and shorn of occult references, numerology, traditionalism and other eccentric metaphysics". In 2022, Foreign Policy also noted: "The recent invasion of Ukraine is a continuation of a Dugin-promoted strategy for weakening the international liberal order." According to Anton Shekhovtsov, the book's cover contains a depiction of a Chaos Star, a symbol that represents chaos magick in modern occult movements, and the use of the symbol aligns with Dugin's general interest in the occult and occult symbolism. After the publication of the book, Dugin has also used the symbol as the logo of his Eurasia Party.

See also
 Geopolitics of Russia
 "What Russia should do with Ukraine"
 Rashism

References

External links
 Foundations of Geopolitics – Russian edition
 Foundations of Geopolitics – Machine-translated English version
 Review of Foundations of Geopolitics by John B. Dunlop

1997 non-fiction books
2022 Russian invasion of Ukraine in popular culture
Anti-Americanism
Books about civilizations
Eurasianism
Far-right politics in Russia
Foreign relations of Russia
Geopolitical rivalry
Military education and training in Russia
Military training books
National Bolshevism
Political books
Ruscism
Russian non-fiction books
Russian irredentism
Russian nationalism
Works about geopolitics
Russian philosophy